San Sebastián is a village in Argentina, located on the southwestern shore of San Sebastián Bay, on National Route 3 in the Río Grande Department of Tierra del Fuego Province. As of 2012, it has a population of 940.

References

Populated places in Tierra del Fuego Province, Argentina
Cities and towns in Tierra del Fuego
Populated coastal places in Argentina
Populated places established in 1983
1983 establishments in Argentina